Horler is an uncommon family name that originated in Somerset, England. Its earliest appearance was around 1600 as an occupational name for coal transporters, or "haulers".

People with the surname "Horler"
 David Horler (born 1943), English jazz trombonist
 Ed Horler (born 1995), English field hockey player
 George Horler (1895–1967), English footballer
 John Horler (born 1947), English jazz pianist
 Natalie Horler (born 1981), English-German singer and television presenter
 Sacha Horler (born 1970), Australian actress
 Sydney Horler (1888–1954), British novelist

References

Surnames
Occupational surnames
Surnames of English origin
Surnames of British Isles origin
English-language surnames